Colin Sidney Hayes  (16 February 1924 – 21 May 1999) was an Australian champion trainer of thoroughbred racehorses based in Adelaide, South Australia.

During his career he trained 5,333 winners including 524 individual Group or Listed winners. He won 28 Adelaide and 13 Melbourne Trainers' Premierships.

The C S Hayes Stakes is named in his honour and run annually at Flemington Racecourse.

Hayes was elevated to Legend status in the Australian Racing Hall of Fame in 2018, a feat only achieved by two other horse trainers, TJ Smith and Bart Cummings.

Early days

Hayes was born in Semaphore, South Australia on 16 February 1924. His father died when he was 10 years old. On leaving school he gained employment with the South Australian Electricity Trust as a boilermaker, but his love of horses soon led him to purchase a steeplechaser named Surefoot for £9. As an amateur rider, Hayes rode Surefoot himself with his best result being a third in the 1948 Great Eastern Steeplechase run at Oakbank.

Popular legend has it that Hayes bet his honeymoon money on Surefoot, which ran third at odds of 60/1, enabling him to recoup the money and a little profit. His wife Betty was apparently very angry about the incident at the time.

His son David followed in his footsteps and is a horse trainer. His other son was also a trainer, but Peter Hayes, who at the time was training Fields Of Omagh, died in an airplane crash in 2001.

Initial success

Hayes's initial moderate success with Surefoot drove him to expand his operations and he set up stables called 'Surefoot Lodge' at Semaphore. He won his first Adelaide trainers' premiership in 1956 but decided he wanted to expand his operations into breeding winners as well.

Hayes chose a place in the Barossa Valley approximately 80 kilometres north-east of Adelaide, with many people saying it was too far out of the metropolitan area to succeed.

A syndicate of people was formed to purchase the property known as Lindsay Park, an 800-hectare property of very rich pasture land and superb paddocks. The centrepiece of the property is a magnificent 38-room mansion built in 1840 by George Fife Angas from sandstone and marble quarried on the property.

In making the move Hayes lost several owners and promising horses, reducing his stable from 40 to 16 horses.

He officially began training there on 1 August 1970 and over the next 29 years created one of the most successful breeding and training establishments in the world.

A sign of his success is the world record 10 individual winners in a day, a feat he achieved on 23 January 1982.

Major wins

Amongst the many thousands of races won by Hayes and his horses were the following major race wins:

VRC Melbourne Cup

 1980 Beldale Ball
 1986 At Talaq

VATC Caulfield Cup

 1976 How Now

MVRC W.S.Cox Plate

 1978 So Called
 1979 Dulcify
 1989 Almaarad

STC Golden Slipper Stakes

 1985 Rory's Jester

VRC Newmarket Handicap

 1977 Desirable
 1985 Red Tempo
 1988 Special
 1989 Grandiose

VRC Australian Cup

 1974 Bush Win
 1979 Dulcify

VRC Derby

 1974 Haymaker
 1976 Unaware
 1978 Dulcify
 1988 King's High

AJC Derby

 1979 Dulcify
 1981 Our Paddy Boy

SAJC Adelaide Cup

 1962 Cheong Sam
 1972 Wine Taster
 1980 Yashmak
 1990 Water Boatman

Breeding

Hayes also played a major role in the Australian breeding industry by standing quality stallions such as Romantic, Without Fear and Godswalk.

Some of the horses he trained also went on to highly successful stud careers including Rory's Jester, At Talaq and Zabeel.

References

External links
Australian Racing Museum and Hall of Fame website
Lindsay Park website

1924 births
1999 deaths
Australian racehorse trainers
Australian Officers of the Order of the British Empire
Australian Thoroughbred Racing Hall of Fame inductees
Members of the Order of Australia
Australian boilermakers
Sportspeople from Adelaide
Sport Australia Hall of Fame inductees